"I Want to Thank You" may refer to the following songs:

 "I Want to Thank You" (1965), by Otis Redding on the album The Great Otis Redding Sings Soul Ballads
 "I Want to Thank You" (1969), by Billy Preston on the album That's the Way God Planned It
 "I Want to Thank You" (1981), by Alicia Myers on the album Alicia
 "I Want to Thank You" (1993), by Robin S. on the album Show Me Love

See also
 I Wanna Thank Me, 2019 studio album by Snoop Dogg
 "I Wanna Thank Me" (song), the title track
 "Kind & Generous", or "I Want to Thank You Song" by Natalie Merchant